A test case is a set of conditions and variables used to test a software application.

Test case may also refer to:

 Test case (law), a case brought to set a legal precedent
 "The Test Case", a 1915 short story by P. G. Wodehouse
 The Test Case (web series), a 2017 Hindi web series